Adekundo Adesoji is a paralympic athlete from Nigeria competing mainly in category T12 sprint events.

Adekundo only ever competed at one Paralympics, the 2004 Summer Paralympics in Athens but it was a very successful games as he took a clean sweep of the T12 sprint gold medals, with gold in the 100m, 200m and 400m.

References

External links
 

Year of birth missing (living people)
Living people
Nigerian male sprinters
Paralympic athletes of Nigeria
Paralympic medalists in athletics (track and field)
Paralympic gold medalists for Nigeria
Athletes (track and field) at the 2004 Summer Paralympics
Medalists at the 2004 Summer Paralympics
Yoruba sportspeople